Montsaugeon is a former commune in the Haute-Marne department in north-eastern France. On 1 January 2016, it was merged into the new commune Le Montsaugeonnais. Its population was 83 in 2019.

See also
Communes of the Haute-Marne department

References 

Former communes of Haute-Marne